Raoul Girardet (6 October 1917 – 18 September 2013) was a French historian who specialized in military societies, colonialism and French nationalism.
As a young man he was involved with the right-wing Action Française movement.
He was not antisemitic, but was passionately nationalistic.
During World War II he supported the French Resistance. Later he supported the OAS struggle against giving independence to Algeria.

Life

Raoul Girardet was born on 6 October 1917.
His father, grandfather, uncle and cousin were career officers, and he was named after an uncle killed in action in September 1914 during World War I.
He attended the école Levert in Belleville and then the Lycée Voltaire in the 11th arrondissement of Paris.
He was influenced by the work of Péguy.
In the 1930s he was involved in the right-wing Action Française.
During World War II he studied at the Sorbonne, where he was taught by Pierre Renouvin and Jérôme Carcopino.
He passed his agrégation in History, qualifying as a teacher.
He did not share the antisemitism of some followers of Maurras and eventually joined the resistance, like many other Action Française sympathizers.
He was later awarded the Croix de Guerre 1939–1945 and was made an officer of the Legion of Honour.

At the start of the German occupation of France Roland Laudenbach co-edited the literary review Prétexte with Jean Turlais and François Sentein, and was associated with the theater company "Le Rideau des jeunes" led by Pierre Franck, whom he had met through Jean Cocteau.
Prétexte was replaced by Cahiers de la génération in 1941, and its team became the core of the Cahiers français published by the Vichy youth organization.
The Cahiers français attracted nonconformists of the 1930s such as Louis Salleron, Jean de Fabrègues, René Vincent and Pierre Andreu, and followers of Charles Maurras such as  Raoul Girardet, Antoine Blondin and Jean Turlais.

Raoul Girardet specialized as a historian in military societies, the colonial concept and French nationalism.
In 1953, as a teacher at the Lycée Lakanal, he published La Société militaire, which attracted much attention.
He was appointed assistant and then assistant master at the Sorbonne.
During the Algerian War he remained faithful to the idea of French Algeria, and thought that General Charles de Gaulle had betrayed the people.
To some extent he participated in the activities of the OAS in the "Action politique et propagande" branch, along with intellectuals such as François Bluche, Jules Monnerot and Jacques Laurent.
He wrote for L'Esprit public, and signed a manifesto affirming the "civilizing mission" of the army in Algeria, along with writers such as Roger Nimier and Henri Massis.
In 1961 he was arrested for his activism in favour of the OAS, which resisted giving Algeria independence.
His involvement with the OAS earned him an arrest and time in jail.

After this he mainly devoted himself to work on the major themes of nationalism, colonialism and the military question.
He became a lecturer and then a professor at the Institut d'études politiques de Paris (IEP) in Paris.
In the 1960s he taught a course at the IEP on "The Movement of Political Ideas in Contemporary France" with René Rémond and Jean Touchard, Secretary General of the National Foundation for Political Science.
He published reference works on The Military Society in France, French Nationalism and The Colonial Idea in France, And an essay on Myths and Political Mythologies.
In 1990 in Singulièrement libre, a book of interviews with the journalist Pierre Assouline, he reasserted his love of his country which led to his participation in the Resistance and is commitment to French Algeria.
Girardet died on 18 September 2013 at the age of 95.

Publications

Notes

Sources

1917 births
2013 deaths
20th-century French historians